Dwight Livingston Wilson (April 14, 1887 – September 8, 1950) was an American college football coach.  He was the head football coach at Michigan State Normal College—now known as Eastern Michigan University—in Ypsilanti, Michigan for one season, in 1911, compiling a record of 3–4.

Wilson died in 1950.

Head coaching record

Football

References

External links
 

1887 births
1950 deaths
Eastern Michigan Eagles football coaches
Eastern Michigan Eagles football players
People from Dwight, Illinois